Edward John Cecil Neep (13 October 1900 – 3 October 1980) was a British barrister and frequent political candidate.

Born in Southwark, Neep was educated at Westminster School.  He initially worked as a chemist, but from 1920 as a journalist, and then in 1923 became a barrister with the Middle Temple.

Neep was a supporter of the Labour Party and stood in numerous elections, never winning a Parliamentary seat.  His first contest was in Woodbridge at the 1922 United Kingdom general election, where he took 43.3% of the vote.  He stood in the seat again in 1923, but his vote share fell to only 21.1%, and he dropped to third place.  At the 1924 United Kingdom general election, he instead stood in Leeds Central, managing 40.4% of the vote.  His final contest was Lowestoft at the 1931 United Kingdom general election, where he won 32.3% of the votes cast.

During the 1930s and 1940s, Neep focused on his career as a barrister, and wrote several books, including A Handbook of Church Law, and Gladstone: a spectrum.  He became a King's Counsel in 1946, and in 1952 became deputy speaker of the Legislative Council of Kenya.

References

1900 births
1980 deaths
English barristers
Labour Party (UK) parliamentary candidates
People educated at Westminster School, London
20th-century English lawyers